The Secretaries Cup is an annual college football game in the northeast United States between the  and the   Both academies compete in NCAA Division III athletics.

The Secretaries Cup is an intense rivalry game for both schools.  Although not matching the intensity or tradition of the  the Secretaries Cup is often described as a small-college version of that matchup.

The rivalry was designated as the "Secretary's Cup"  in 1981, when both academies were in the jurisdiction of the Department of Transportation. The name of the contest was pluralized when the U.S. Coast Guard moved to the Department of Homeland Security in 2003.

The two campuses are at opposite ends of Long Island Sound. The game alternates between the Coast Guard's Cadet Memorial Field in New London, Connecticut, and the Merchant Marine's Captain Tomb Field in Kings Point, New York just east of New York City.

The game had been played on the last Saturday of the Division III football regular season (generally mid-November) from 1991 through 2005. When the Coast Guard Academy joined the New England Football Conference in 2006, the rivalry became a non-conference game and was moved to September. In 2017, the game moved back to November when the New England Women's and Men's Athletic Conference (NEWMAC)  began sponsoring football with both teams as conference members. The 2017 game was played at 12 noon on Veterans Day, November 11.

The games have been broadcast on ESPN streaming networks since 2017.

Results
Through 2022, the Merchant Marine Academy has an overall lead in the series . Since the Secretaries Cup was established in 1981, the Merchant Marine Academy leads . There have been no ties in the series.

The 2020 meeting, won 24–14 by Merchant Marine, was notable as the only Division III football game played in calendar 2020. The NCAA canceled the 2020 D-III football season due to the COVID-19 pandemic; it planned to move the division's championship tournament to spring 2021 before canceling it entirely. Nonetheless, the two academies chose to play their rivalry game on its normal schedule. Both schools had also chosen not to play football in spring 2021, making this their only game of the 2020–21 school year.

See also
Commander-in-Chief's Trophy

References

Further reading

External links
College Football Data Warehouse  – Coast Guard vs. Merchant Marine

College football rivalry trophies in the United States
Coast Guard Bears football
Merchant Marine Mariners football